Virtue is a virtual session manager running under IBM's VM.

The product 

Virtue , "virtual tube", was the first session manager commercially available for the VM environment on IBM mainframes. The product allows users to use a standard 3270 monitor to control multiple sessions, whether VM/CMS, DOS/VSE, z/VSE MVS, z/OS, or other operating systems or applications such as CICS, Westi, or DUCS sessions.

Virtue runs as a highly privileged CMS task, designed to accommodate model IBM 3270 monitors and their descendants. Even after competition entered the market, the product remains known for its innovation, speed, and compact size.

Development 

The product was developed by III (Independent Intelligence Incorporated) of Orlando, Florida. The software designer was Leigh Lundin.

Although the package nominally ran as a highly privileged CMS session and utilized CMS services, it deployed an internal multitasking mechanism called a "subvisor", which queued and prioritized tasks to be done.  Macintosh versions prior to macOS and IBM's OS/2 came to use similar mechanisms for task control.

Product development occurred at III offices within Westinghouse Automation Intelligence division,  Orlando, Florida. Broad range in-depth testing was conducted at IBM's data center in Tampa, Florida and the IBM lab in Böblingen, Germany.

Marketing 

Westinghouse Electric Management Systems, SA (WEMSSA), Paris, London, Geneva, Zürich, Munich, and Amsterdam, acquired the marketing rights, initially for Europe, Africa, and the Far East.

Westinghouse Electric, Pittsburgh, subsequently acquired rights for the Americas.

The concept found its way onto early PC platforms at the time, notably Apple Computer's Switcher for the Macintosh and subsequent products for the IBM PC.

References

Process (computing)
IBM mainframe software
VM (operating system)